The 2006 FINA Women's Water Polo World Cup was the fourteenth edition of the event, organised by the world's governing body in aquatics, the International Swimming Federation (FINA). The event took place in Tianjin, PR China from August 8 to August 13, 2006. Participating teams were the eight best teams from the last World Championships in Montreal, Quebec, Canada (2005). The top-five qualified for the 2007 World Aquatics Championships in Melbourne, Australia.

Teams

GROUP A

GROUP B

Squads

Gemma Beadsworth
Nicole Dyson
Suzie Fraser
Taniele Gofers
Kate Gynther
Fiona Hammond
Bronwen Knox
Emma Knox
Alicia McCormack
Patrice O'Neill
Melissa Rippon
Rebecca Rippon
Mia Santoromito
Head coach:
Greg McFadden

Gao Ao
He Jin
Li Shuwei
Liu Ping
Ma Huanhuan
Mo Fengmin
Qiao Leiying
Sun Huizi
Sun Yating
Sun Yujun
Wang Yi
Yang Jun
Xu Zheng
Head coach:
Pan Shengwa

Alexandra Asimaki
Alkisti Avramidou
Christina Dimitrokali
Angeliki Gerolymou
Sofia Iosifidou
Kelina Kantzou
Konstantina Kouteli
Stavroula Kozompoli
Georgia Lara
Vasileia Mavrelou
Triantafyllia Manolioudaki
Stella Mitsani
Maria Tsouri
Head coach:
Kyriakos Iosifidis

Timea Benkő
Fruzsina Brávik
Barbara Bujka
Rita Drávucz
Patricia Horváth
Anikó Pelle
Ágnes Primász
Mercédesz Stieber
Orsolya Takacs
Eszter Tomaskovics
Andrea Tóth
Ágnes Valkai
Krisztina Zantleitner
Head coach:
Péter Szilágyi

Silvia Bosurgi
Teresa Frassinetti
Eleonora Gay
Elena Gigli
Tania di Mario
Martina Miceli
Maddelena Musumeci
Francesca Pavan
Cinzia Ragusa
Federica Rocco
Daria Starace
Erzsébet Valkai
Manuela Zanchi
Head coach:
Mauro Maugeri

Olga Fomicheva
Yulia Gaufler
Nadezda Glyzina
Sofia Konukh
Marina Mazepova
Ekaterina Pantyulina
Evgeniya Protsenko
Natalia Ryzhova-Alenicheva
Natalya Shepelina
Elena Smurova
Evgenia Soboleva
Alena Vylegzhanina
Anastasia Zubkova
Head coach:
Alexander Kleymenov

Elizabeth Armstrong
Patricia Cardenas
Kameryn Craig
Emily Feher
Erika Figge
Natalie Golda
Alison Gregorka
Ericka Lorenz
Moriah van Norman
Heather Petri
Brenda Villa
Lauren Wenger
Elsie Windes
Head coach:
Guy Baker

Preliminary round

GROUP A

August 8, 2006

August 9, 2006

August 10, 2006

GROUP B

August 8, 2006

August 9, 2006

August 10, 2006

Quarterfinals
August 11, 2006

Semifinals
August 12, 2006

Finals
August 11, 2006 — Seventh place

August 12, 2006 — Fifth place

August 13, 2006 — Bronze Medal

August 13, 2006 — Gold Medal

Final ranking

The top-five qualified for the 2007 World Water Polo Championship in Melbourne, Australia.

Individual awards
Most Valuable Player
???

Best Goalkeeper
???

Top Scorer
Tania di Mario

References

  FINA

FINA Women's Water Polo World Cup
International water polo competitions hosted by China
F
W
Water Polo World Cup
Women's water polo in China
August 2006 sports events in Asia
Sports competitions in Tianjin
21st century in Tianjin